The Maya Declaration is a global initiative for responsible and sustainable financial inclusion that aims to reduce poverty and ensure financial stability for the benefit of all. It is the first global and measurable set of financial inclusion commitments by developing and emerging economies.

Since its launch at the 2011 Global Policy Forum (GPF) in Mexico, members of the Alliance for Financial Inclusion (AFI) have made concrete financial inclusion targets, continued to implement in-country policy improvements and regularly shared progress updates on the AFI Data Portal (ADP).

As of October 2021, AFI member institutions have made a total of 885 Maya Declarations targets. AFI members include roughly 101 central banks and other financial regulatory institutions from nearly 90 emerging and developing economies.

AFI is committed to supporting its members in fully achieving their commitments to contributing towards more inclusive development and poverty alleviation.

Background 

The Maya Declaration is broad in nature, focusing on creating the right environment; implementing the correct framework; ensuring consumer protection measures are taken and using data to inform and track financial inclusion efforts. The declaration was made through AFI's network of financial institutions and, although no vote was taken, its common principles have been implicitly adopted by all the network's members.

Founding members:

 Comisión Nacional Bancaria y de Valores  
 Superintendencia de Banca, Seguros y AFP del Peru
 Reserve Bank of Fiji
 Bank of Tanzania
 Banque de la Republique du Burundi  
 Banque Centrale de la Republique de Guinee 
 Bank of Uganda
 Central Bank of Kenya
 Central Bank of Nigeria
 Reserve Bank of Malawi
 National Bank of Rwanda

The Maya Declaration is the first global and measurable set of commitments made by developing countries to increase financial inclusion. It is underpinned by three core values that have sustained the impact of the platform:

 Self-determination: Each institution sets its own targets in recognition of the fact that country circumstances vary and that there is no simple, off-the-shelf solution.
 Peer-to-peer knowledge exchange: Harness mutual sharing and collaboration within the network to leverage practical and innovative policy solutions that address financial inclusion challenges.
 International cooperation: Effective knowledge partnerships with policymakers and regulators from developed countries, multilateral corporations, research institutions, private sector and funders to enhancing inclusive finance

The Maya Declaration has paved the way for the development and implementation of various accords over the years. Each emphasizes a specific aspect of financial inclusion and corresponds to the needs of financial regulators and policymakers against the outlook of the financial sector.

Thematic areas 
AFI members report progress towards achieving their targets into the ADP, an integrated public database of financial inclusion policies, targets, regulations and outcomes that is powered by policymakers and regulators. The ADP empowers countries to share their financial inclusion stories, share knowledge and experience, and report their target progress to create a unique peer learning platform among the AFI members.

Thematic areas available on the ADP:

 Agent banking
 Digital financial services
 Consumer empowerment and market conduct
 Consumer protection
 E-money
 National financial inclusion strategies
 Gender inclusive finance 
 Financial identity
 Financial inclusion data
 Inclusive green finance
 SME finance
 Credit information systems
 Financial inclusion of forcibly displaced persons
 Financial inclusion for youth
 Financial integrity
 Financial literacy and financial education
 Financial stability
 Global standards 
 Microcredit and microsavings
 Microinsurance
 Mobile Financial Services
 Overarching national goals 
 Others

AFI accords 
The Maya Declaration laid the groundwork for AFI members to develop and adopt a series of accords, action plans and statements that outline specific goals and target different aspects of financial inclusion.

Maya Declaration: A decade-long journey 
As of 2021, 10 years after its launch, almost 80 percent of AFI member institutions have made a Maya Declaration commitment. The 73 countries with institutional commitments are represented by 82 institutions that have collectively made 885 targets into the ADP.

List of institutions with Maya Declaration commitments:

* Former AFI member institution that made a commitment while active in the network.

** BCEAO represents Benin, Burkina Faso, Guinea-Bissau, Côte d'Ivoire, Mali, Niger, Senegal and Togo.

Full text of Maya Declaration 

Maya Declaration on Financial Inclusion
We, the Members of the Alliance for Financial Inclusion, a network of central banks, supervisors and other financial regulatory authorities met in Riviera Maya, Mexico, 28 to 30 September 2011, on the occasion of the Third AFI Global Policy Forum,
Recognize the critical importance of financial inclusion to empowering and transforming the lives of all our people, especially the poor, its role in improving national and global financial stability and integrity and its essential contribution to strong and inclusive growth in developing and emerging market countries;
Reaffirm the value of peer-to-peer knowledge exchange and learning among financial regulators and policymakers for the design and implementation of innovative financial inclusion policy solutions relevant to the developing world;
Recall our efforts over the last two years to strengthen and expand the AFI network and to identify and explore high-priority areas for financial inclusion policy in the developing world through AFI’s working groups;
Commit as a network of developing and emerging market financial regulators and policymakers to:
a.    Putting in place a financial inclusion policy that creates an enabling environment for costeffective access to financial services that makes full use of appropriate innovative technology and substantially lowers the unit cost of financial services;
b.   Implementing a sound and proportional regulatory framework that achieves the complementary goals of financial inclusion, financial stability, and financial integrity;
c.    Recognizing consumer protection and empowerment as key pillars of financial inclusion efforts to ensure that all people are included in their country’s financial sector;
d.    Making evidence-based financial inclusion policy a priority by collecting and analyzing comprehensive data, tracking the changing profile of financial inclusion, and producing comparable indicators in the network.
We remain dedicated to making financial inclusion a reality through concerted domestic and global actions, and actively sharing our knowledge and experience through the AFI network. We commit to delivering concrete financial inclusion outcomes for the developing world to provide sustainable, relevant, cost-effective, and meaningful financial services for the world’s financially unserved populations.

External links 
 Alliance for Financial Inclusion
 Full Text of the Maya Declaration (PDF): English| Spanish | French

References 

Maya Declaration